St Mary's School is the only school serving Edinburgh of the Seven Seas on the island of Tristan da Cunha. The school caters for children between the ages of three and sixteen.

History 
During the island's early colonial history, founder William Glass sent his children to Britain for their education. The first teacher to arrive on the island was Benjamin Pankhurst in 1830, who remained for two years. A school was later established in William Glass's home, by Rev. Taylor, the island's first minister.

The first purpose-built school, St. Mary's was not opened until 1975.

References 

Buildings and structures in Edinburgh of the Seven Seas
Educational institutions established in 1975
Tristan da Cunha